The World Group II was the second highest level of Fed Cup competition in 1996. Winning nations advanced to the World Group Play-offs, and the losing nations were demoted to the World Group II Play-offs.

Bulgaria vs. Slovakia

Netherlands vs. Australia

Indonesia vs. Belgium

Canada vs. Czech Republic

References

See also
Fed Cup structure

World Group II